Matthew W. McFarlane is United States Army major general who serves as commander of Combined Joint Task Force – Operation Inherent Resolve since September 8, 2022. He most recently served as the deputy commanding general of United States Army Pacific from August 2021 to July 2022. He served as the commanding general of the 4th Infantry Division from 2019 to 2021. Previously, he was the Senior Military Assistant to the Deputy Secretary of Defense.

References

External links
 

Living people
Place of birth missing (living people)
Recipients of the Defense Distinguished Service Medal
Recipients of the Distinguished Service Medal (US Army)
Recipients of the Legion of Merit
United States Army generals
United States Army personnel of the Iraq War
United States Army personnel of the War in Afghanistan (2001–2021)
Year of birth missing (living people)